Lozano is a census-designated place (CDP) in Cameron County, Texas, United States. The population was 404 at the 2010 census, up from 324 at the 2000 census. It is part of the Brownsville–Harlingen Metropolitan Statistical Area.

Geography
Lozano is located north of the center of Cameron County at  (26.189952, -97.542312).

Demographics
At the 2000 census, there were 324 people, 101 households and 84 families residing in the CDP. The population density was 2,805.2 per square mile (1,042.5/km2). There were 111 housing units at an average density of 961.0/sq mi (357.1/km2). The racial makeup of the CDP was 100.00% White. Hispanic or Latino of any race were 98.46% of the population.

There were 101 households, of which 34.7% had children under the age of 18 living with them, 62.4% were married couples living together, 16.8% had a female householder with no husband present, and 16.8% were non-families. 15.8% of all households were made up of individuals, and 7.9% had someone living alone who was 65 years of age or older. The average household size was 3.21 and the average family size was 3.60.

25.3% of the population were under the age of 18, 13.3% from 18 to 24, 29.3% from 25 to 44, 20.1% from 45 to 64, and 12.0% who were 65 years of age or older. The median age was 31 years. For every 100 females, there were 97.6 males. For every 100 females age 18 and over, there were 90.6 males.

The median household income was $19,792, and the median family income was $33,500. Males had a median income of $22,679 versus $18,036 for females. The per capita income for the CDP was $9,782. About 41.9% of families and 30.2% of the population were below the poverty line, including 21.3% of those under age 18 and 100.0% of those age 65 or over.

Education
Lozano is served by the Rio Hondo Independent School District.

In addition, South Texas Independent School District operates magnet schools that serve the community.

Government and infrastructure
The United States Postal Service operates the Lozano Post Office.

References

Census-designated places in Cameron County, Texas
Census-designated places in Texas